Colin Stuart Lovell-Smith (26 March 1894 – 10 June 1960) was a New Zealand artist who with his wife, Rata Lovell-Smith, developed an influential style of representation of the New Zealand landscape. They were both teachers at the Canterbury College School of Art and he was director from 1947 until his early death from cancer in 1960.

References

1894 births
1960 deaths
20th-century New Zealand painters
20th-century New Zealand male artists
People from Christchurch